Haryana is a state in India. The state houses several sites from the Indus Valley Civilization, which was a cradle of civilization. In the Mahabharata, Haryana is mentioned as Bahudanayak Region.

Haryana has been ruled by various non-native polities including the Gupta Empire, Pushyabhuti dynasty, Gurjara-Pratihara Dynasty, Tomara Dynasty, Chahamanas of Shakambhari, Ghurid dynasty, Delhi Sultanate, Mughal Empire, Durrani Empire, Maratha Empire, (George Thomas), Gwalior State, Company Rule in India and British Raj.

The Jats significantly ruled the Haryana region which was earlier Punjab. Some Jat states in Haryana state were Jind, Kaithal, Hisar, Ladwa, Ballabgarh, Kalsia and others. Jats in Mughal period were ruling under Khap panchayat heads. And in later medieval period, they were ruling under Misls and Sikh Empire.

During Delhi Sultanate and Mughal Empire, Haryana was known as Delhi Subah. Many historically significant battles have been fought in it such as Battle of Tarain, Battle of Panipat, and Battle of Karnal.

After the Mughals, Haryana became Maratha Empire possession. After the treaty of Surji-Anjangaon of 1803, Haryana was annexed by the British Empire and was later merged with North West Provinces. After revolt of 1857, in April 1858 Haryana, then known as Delhi Territory, was merged with Punjab Province as a punishment.

During the British Colonial period, from 1858 to 1947 it was administered as a part of the Punjab province. It became a separate administrative state of India in 1966. Chandigarh is the joint capital for the states of Punjab and Haryana.

Chronological history

Paleolithic 

History of human presence in Haryana dates back to 100,000 years ago. Archaeologists discovered cave paintings and tools in Mangar Bani hill forest in May 2021; the cave paintings are estimated to be 100,000 years old. These are believed to be the largest in the Indian subcontinent and possibly the world's oldest.

Neolithic 

Neolithic are numerous in Haryana, specially the pre-IVC phases found at Bhirrana, Siswal, Rakhigarhi, Kunal, etc.

Indus Valley Civilisation 

Indus Valley civilisation evolved on the banks of Rigvedic rivers Indus and Sarasvati rivers. Sarasvati and its tributary Drishadvati river (Ghaggar) flow through north and central Haryana and there are numerous IVC sites in haryana along paleochannels of these rivers, notable among those are the Rakhi Garhi, Banawali, Bhirrana, Farmana, Jognakhera, Mitathal, Siswal, and IVC mines and smelter at Tosham. Haryana govt is undertaking projects to revive Saraswati and Rakhigarhi Indus Valley Civilisation Museum has been constructed for the conservation of the artifacts.

Vedic period

During the Vedic era, there were janapada in Haryana from 1500 BCE 6th century BCE, which evolved into mahajanapadas which lasted from 6th century BCE to 4th century BCE. During Janpada period Kuru janpada covered most of Haryana and their area was called Kurukshetra, except South Haryana where Matsaya janpada (700–300 BCE) covered Mewat in Haryana (and Alwar in Rajasthan) and Surasena janpada covered Braj region including parts of Haryana near Barsana (such as Punhana and Hodal). After mahabharta and subsequent ashvamedha yagna, Kuru janpada evolved into a mahajanapada which sovereignty over other janpadas. The sandy bagar tract in northwestern and westcentral Haryana on Haryana-Rajasthan border was part of the larger jangladesh which also covered thar area of Rajasthan. Lord Krishna revealed Bhagavad Gita to Arjuna at Jyotisar. Śrauta were codified in Haryana during Kuru mahajanpada era, and notable sites in Haryana related to rishi authors are Bilaspur (Vyas Puri) and Kapal Mochan both related to Rishi Ved Vyasa who wrote mahabharta on the banks of Saraswati at hish ashram at Bilaspur, Dhosi Hill was ashram of Rishi Chyavana, who is mentioned in mahabharta, and he is well known for creating chyavanprash and detailed formula for which first appeared in the ayurvedic text Charaka Samhita.

In some ancient Hindu texts, the boundaries of Kurukshetra (the area under Kuru janpada, not just the modern day Kurukshetra city) correspond roughly to the state of Haryana. Thus according to the Taittiriya Aranyaka 5.1.1., the Kurukshetra region is south of Turghna (Srughna/Sugh), north of Khandavprastha forest (Delhi and Mewat region), east of Maru Pradesh (marusthal or desert) and west of Parin. Some of these historic places are included in the 48 Kos Parikrama of Kurukshetra.

Pre-Islamic Hindu-Buddhist period

After ousting the Huns, king Harshavardhana established his capital at Thanesar near Kurukshetra in the 7th century CE. After his death, the kingdom of his clansmen, the Pratiharas ruled over a vast region for quite a while from Harsha's adopted capital Kannauj. The region remained strategically important for the rulers of North India even though Thanesar was no more as central as Kannauj. Prithviraj Chauhan established forts at Taraori and Hansi in the 12th century.

Sultanate period
Muhammad Ghori conquered Haryana after the Second Battle of Tarain. Following his death, the Delhi Sultanate was established that ruled much of India for several centuries. The earliest reference to 'Hariana' occurs in a Sanskrit inscription dated 1328 AD kept in Delhi Museum, which refers to this region as The heaven on earth, indicating that it was fertile and relatively peaceful at that time. Firuz Shah Tughlaq established a fort at Hisar in 1354 to further fortify the region, and also constructed canals or rajwahas as they were referred to in the Indo-Persian historical texts.

Mughal Empire 

The three famous battles of Panipat took place near the modern town of Panipat. The first battle took place in 1526, where Babur, the ruler of Kabul defeated Ibrahim Lodi of the Delhi Sultanate, through the use of field artillery. This battle marked the beginning of the Mughal Empire in India.

In the Second Battle of Panipat (5 November 1556), Akbar's general Bairam Khan defeated Hemu, the local Haryanvi who grew up in Rewari. Hemu, who belonged to Rewari in Haryana, rose from a businessman to become adviser to Afghan kings and then Prime Minister-cum-Chief of Army. He fought and won 22 battles in between 1553 and 1556, from Punjab to Bengal against Afghans and Mughals and won all of them without losing any. Hemu defeated Akbar's army at Tughlaqabad in Battle of Delhi-1556 and became king at Delhi on 7 October 1556 declaring himself as Vikramaditya following the reigns of earlier Vedic kings. Hemu died in the Second Battle of Panipat.

Maratha period (1756–1801)
The Third Battle of Panipat was fought in 1761 between the Afghan Emperor Ahmad Shah Abdali and the Maratha Empire under Sadashivrao Bhau of Pune. Ahmad Shah won decisively, on 13 January 1761.

Colonial period

1857 war of independence

The Indian Rebellion of 1857 war started first at Ambala Cantonment, 8 hours before revolt started in Meerut, when the soldiers of 5th Indian Infantry Brigade and 60th Indian Infantry Brigade revolted but it was crushed. 5th and 60th Regiments of Benga Native Infantry rebelled at Umballa (Ambala). During the Battle of Narnaul at Nasibpur on 16 November 1857, British lost 70 British soldiers and their commanders colonel Gerrard and Captain Wallace. 40 British soldiers and officers Captain Craige, Captain Kennedy and Captain Pearse were wounded. The major centers of rebellion were at Hisar, Hansi, Sirsa, Rohtak, Jhajjar, Bahadurgarh, Farrukhnagar, Ballabhgarh, Rewari, Ambala, Panipat and Thanesar. Under the "Delhi Agency" there were seven Princely states, Jhajjar, Farrukhnagar, Ballabhgarh, Loharu, Pataudi and Dujana. The Chiefs of the last two estates remained loyal to the British and others rebelled. The Rajput rulers of Rajasthan also kept out of the mutiny.

Raja Nahar Singh was the ruler of Ballabhgarh, Rao Tula Ram ruler of Rewari and his cousin Gopal Dev, Nawab Abdur Rahman Khan Jhajjar, Nawab Ahmad Ali of Farrukhnagar, Sadruddin the peasant leader of Mewat, Harsukh Rai and Mirza Gauhar Ali of Palwal and Imam of Bu Ali Shah Qalandar mosque in Panipat played key role.

After the failure of revolt by Indians, Haryana was taken out of North-Western Provinces and merged with Punjab as a punishment.

This rebellion was partly caused by the unjust tax system implemented through the use of The Great Hedge of India, a historic inland customs border which ran through several states including Haryana.

Independence and riots
Lala Lajpat Rai worked towards the social reform, spread of Arya Samaj, creation of mass support for the Indian independence movement and he died protesting against the Simon Commission. Lala Murlidhar of Ambala and journalist Balmukund Gupt of Rewari were the members of the founding session of congress who promoted Swadeshi movement. Chhotu Ram, Pandit Nekiram Sharma, Lala Ugrasen and Ramswaroop Jaglan of Bidhwan were also key independence activists.

In 1907, two years after the 1905 Partition of Bengal, British Indian Army soldiers in the 6th Jat Light Infantry and 10th Jats mutinied and sided with Bengali revolutionaries to takeover a government treasury. Their revolt was suppressed by the colonial government and several mutineers were sentenced to prison. In 1914, Kasi Ram Joshi a member of the Ghadar Party hailing from Haryana, returned to India from America. On 15 March 1915 he was hanged by the colonial rulers. Subhas Chandra Bose's Azad Hind Fauj had 2847 soldiers from Haryana, of whom 346 attained martyrdom.

During the partition of India in 1947, state experienced riots at many places, which also scores of death and migration of millions of people from Haryana to Pakistan and vice versa.

Formation of Haryana

Hindi language movement 

Hindi language movement of Punjab 
that started on 30 April 1957 and lasted till 27 December 1957 in Hindi-speaking areas of Punjab, had paved the way for the demand for the formation of Haryana as a separate state for the Hindi speaking people of the united Punjab state. Movement started after government of post-independence Punjab tried to promote Punjabi as state language but many groups in modern Haryana were brainwashed to consider Punjabi as a threat. After this movement was successful in getting the ball rolling for a Hindi-speaking state. Another movement for leftover Punjabi-speaking parts started, this Punjabi suba & Punjabi language movement demanded under which Punjabi and gurmukhi to be made official in after division. After reorganisation, Haryana government banned Punjabi in the state.

In 2018, the Government of Haryana started to award ₹10,000 per month pension to the Matribhasa Satyagrahis (Hindi language activists).

Re-organisation of the Punjab state 
On 1 November 1966, Haryana was carved out of the East Punjab on linguistic grounds, with majorly consisting of the "Hindi Speaking areas". Same example was later followed in creation of Himachal Pradesh as well.

In order to analyse and find a cooperative as well as universally acceptable solution, for the long going vexed linguistic problem, being faced by Punjab, the parliament announced the formation of the Parliamentary Committee on Demand for Punjabi Suba (1966) chairmanned by Sardar Hukam Singh, on 23 September 1965. According to the 90 paged report, the committee initially came to an understanding that a 'co-operative solution' was not possible. Moreover, it stated that unanimity is also not possible or necessary on any matters in a democratic set-up. So, after perusing the large number of memoranda/representations received by the committee and hearing the various view-points expressed by the different witnesses representing the various shades of opinion, the committee suggested the re-organisation of the State of Punjab on linguistic basis. It also stated that the then Chief Minister of the Punjab State admitted that the situation needed a change and status quo in its entirety was not possible." Although a section of the people from the Punjab canvassed before the committee that the status quo might be maintained in the Punjab. Even a third argument advanced in favour of the status quo was that, any reorganisation of the State would not be in the interests of the security of the country and would weaken the defence of India, which was later struck off due to lack of authentic data or justifiable reasons.

On 23 April 1966, while acting on the report submitted by the parliamentary committee, the Indian government set up the Punjab Boundary Commission under the chairmanship of Justice J. C. Shah, to divide and set up the boundaries of Punjab and Haryana. The commission gave its report on 31 May 1966. According to this report the then districts of Hissar, Mahendragarh, Gurgaon, Rohtak, and Karnal were to be a part of the new state of Haryana. Further the Tehsils of Jind (district Sangrur), Narwana (district Sangrur) Naraingarh, Ambala and Jagadhari of district Ambala were also included. The commission recommended that Tehsil Kharar (including Chandigarh) should also be a part of Haryana.

Theme history of Haryana

Administration

Municipalities

Republican democracy

Agriculture

Farming
 
Rakhigarhi granary

Irrigation

Haryana has network of canals across of state divided into 8 canal command areas. Haryana has 47% share (reduced from 70% after an agreement with Delhi in 1994) in Yamuna river water and ?% share in Sutlej river water too for which disputed Sutlej Yamuna link canal is still partially completed for several decades.

In 2019, India utilizes only 93–94% (30 million acre-feet) of its share, and 6–7% ( of India's unitised share flows to Pakistan, resulting in a total of 87% water flowing to Pakistan. India is building three dams to utilize 100% of its 33 million acre-feet share (20% of total water under treaty). India is undertaking 3 projects to ensure India utilizes its full share of Indus Waters Treaty, 
(a) Shahpurkandi dam project on Ravi River in Pathankot district of Punjab (b) Sutlej-Beas link in Punjab (see also Pandoh Dam) and the Ujh Dam project on Ujh River (a tributary of Ravi river) in Jammu and Kashmir. 

Renukaji dam, is INR4,596.76 crore 148m high rockfill gravity dam project being built on the Giri river in Sirmour district with live storage of 0.404 MAF on 1,508 hectares to supply 23 cusec water and generate 40MW peak flow power. An agreement for its construction and sharing of cost and benefits (water and electricity) was signed by the Union Minister for Water and Chief Ministers of six states, namely Haryana (47.8% share of water), UP and Uttakhand (33.65% joint share) Rajasthan (9.3%), Delhi (6.04%) and Himachal Pradesh (3.15), on 11 January 2019. It has been declared a national project, resulting in 90% funding from the centre govt and the rest from the stakeholder states. Giri River (cord: 30.44549 °N and 77.67358 ° Ö) in the state of Uttrakhand and Himachal is a tributary of Yamuna, which in turn is tributary of Ganges.

(a) Lakhwar Dam on Yamuna in Uttrakhand, (b) Renukaji Dam on Giri river in Himchal and (c) Kishau Dam on Tons River in Uttrakhand. The agreements among the stakeholder states and centre govt has been signed for the Kishwar Dam (August 2018 and Renukaji Dam (January 2019) and the agreement for the remaining Kishau Dam is likely to be signed soon. The funding for the Kishwar Dam has already been approved for the centre govt's cabinet and the funding for the Renukaji Dam is expected to be approved soon.

Renukaji dam, is INR4,596.76 crore 148m high rockfileld gravity dam project being built on the Giri river in Sirmour district with live storage of 0.404 MAF on 1,508 hectares to supply 23 cusec water and generate 40MW peak flow power. An agreement for its construction and sharing of cost and benefits (water and electricity) was signed by the Union Minister for Water and Chief Ministers of six states, namely Haryana (47.8% share of water), UP and Uttakhand (33.65% joint share) Rajasthan (9.3%), Delhi (6.04%) and Himachal Pradesh (3.15), on 11 January 2019. It has been declared a national project, resulting in 90% funding from the centre govt and the rest from the stakeholder states. Giri River (cord: 30.44549 °N and 77.67358 ° Ö) in the state of Uttrakhand and Himachal is a tributary of Yamuna, which in turn is tributary of Ganges.

Haryana has 1356 canal tailends of which 250 had not seen the water for up to 39 years. Between 2016 and 2018, govt rejuvenated all but 10 worst tailends. Specially the canals in Narnaul, Loharu and Rewari area were rehabilitated and water started to reach the tailend of canals after a gap of 39 years.
 Johad wetlands and Haryana State Waterbody Management Board. In 2018, govt began rejuvenating 500 of these ponds in the initial phase, 390 injection well were built to pump rainwater into the ground to recharge the groundwater.
 Saraswati
 Adi Badri
 Ghaggar-Hakra River
 Sutlej
 Bhakhra Dam 
 Indira Gandhi Canal
 Sutlej Yamuna link canal
 Yamuna, Haryana has 47.8% share in Yamuna water to be distributed for irrigation.
 Western Yamuna Canal
 Lakhwar Dam: Haryana share is 177 cusec, construction on this national project started in 2018
 Kishau Dam: Haryana share is 709 cusec in this under construction national project.
 Renuka Dam: Haryana share is 266 cusec in this under construction national project.
 Tajewala Barrage (1873) 
 South haryana 
Masani barrage
 Sahibi River including Najafgarh drain
 Krishnavati river (drain 8)
 Dohan river 
 Nuh System of Lakes (also called Kotla lake) with bund built by British Raj.Haryana commenced an INR82 crore project in 2018 to restore these lakes.

Commerce and trade

Industries
 
 Metal smelter and manufacturing at Tosham from Indus Valley civilisation.
 Rakhigarhi silver bronze smelters and manufacturing
 Great Hedge of India for tariffs during British Raj

Mining

Mines at Tosham Hill range from Indus Valley civilisation.

Culture

Clothing

Jewelry and ornaments
 

Rakhigarhi silver bronze ornaments finds and Dancing Girl ornaments.

Textiles
 

Dancing Girl attire.

Haryanvi language

Haryanvi Music

Haryanvi movies

Infrastructure

Architecture

 IVC Black and red ware culture (1450BCE-1200BCE) 
 Vedic Era Painted Grey Ware culture (1200BCE to 600BCE) 
 Pre-Islamic architecture of Haryana 
 Bhima Devi Temple Site Museum
 Kalayat Ancient Bricks Temple Complex
 Adi Badri, Haryana
 Morni Hills Shiva temple
 Pillars of Ashoka in Africa.
 Topra Kalan pillar relocated as Delhi-Topra pillar at Feroz Shah Kotla
 Agroha Mound pillar relocated to Lat Mosque Hisar (bottom half)) and Fatehabad mosque (top half)

Nangal Sirohi in Mahendragarh district, 130 km from Delhi, is popular for its havelis of shekhavati architecture within NCR.

Education
 
Chanetic Buddhist monastic university as chronicled by Hieun Tsang.

Science and technology

Electricity

Post and telegraph

Sports
 

Pashupati Shiva in yoga pose from Indus Valley civilisation.

Transport

Aviation

In 1919, first airstrip was built in Haryana when Ambala Air Force Station was established. Following the independence of India in 1947, it was also the home to the SEPECAT Jaguar of No. 5 Squadron IAF and No. 14 Squadron IAF, and aging MiG-21bis of No. 21 Squadron IAF.

In 1947–48, a Flying Instruction School (FIS) was formed here.

In 1954, FIS Ambala was moved to Tambaram near Chennai in Tamil Nadu, at Tambaram Air Force Station.

By 1964, the diversionary Indian Air Force airfield at Sirsa was ready.

In 1999, Hisar Aviation Club was merged with Haryana Institute of Civil Aviation (HICA). The airport is managed by HICA, which provides flight training using light aircraft.

In 1967, Karnal Air Strip was set up. The Karnal Flying Club has been running at this airfield since 1967 year.

In 1970–71, a privately managed air service was introduced from Delhi-Patiala-Hisar and Delhi which was terminated after a period of about 6 months due to being financially unviable.

During the 1980s, the Gurugram Airstrip, hangar, air conditioned yoga ashram and TV studio were built by former Prime Minister Indira Gandhi's favorite godman and yoga guru Dhirendra Brahmachari who died in 1994 in a plane crash. Indira use to visit Brahmachari here once a week. The 1980s teleserials "India Quiz" and Hum Log (ran from July 1984 to 17 December 1985) were shot here. Brahmachari charged INR25,000 per shift for the use of ashram's TV studio facilities here for the shooting of Hum Log. In 1983, Brahmachari had written letter to then Chief Minister of Haryana, Bhajan Lal, with a request to acquire 5,000 acre land around Aravalli Range, potentially up to 70,000 acres in total, to build facilities to rival Disneyland, including a yoga research and training centre, a wildlife sanctuary, folk arts and crafts centre, amusement centre and other facilities such as helipad, aquarium, planetarium and games and thrillers. The aircraft hangar still has two ruined aircraft belonging to Brahmachari, likely including a Maule M-5 American aircraft owned by him that landed him in investigations for tax evasions. Ownership of some of the facilities is currently being disputed in the court (c. 2014), including 32 acre land and yoga studio.

In 2002, the Delhi Flying Club (DFC) shifted all its flying activities and aircraft to Hisar from Safdarjung Airport in Delhi.

On 31 January 2010, the Rajiv Gandhi National Centre for Aero Sports was inaugurated at Narnaul Airport. 51 acres were acquired for this purpose. Chief Minister Bhupinder Singh Hooda and Aero Club of India President Satish Sharma were present at the inauguration ceremony. The centre was set up by Aero Club of India and the Department of Civil Aviation, Haryana. It is the first ever modern state-of-the-art aero sports centre in India to provide training in comprehensive range of various aero sports, including para-jumping (simulated parachute jump from a tower), parasailing, hot air ballooning, gliding, power flying, sky diving, aero modelling and micro light flying, with the purpose of introducing the state's youth to aviation and providing the general population a cheap opportunity to experience aero sports. On 27 November 2017, Runway 1 a quirky restaurant based inside an Airbus A320 discarded by Air India was opened on Ambala Chandigarh Expressway by a Shahabad based business family.

In August 2018, pre-feasibility study and field study for 3 new greenfield airports in Haryana commenced for the and Chhara Airport (Jhajjar district), Jind Airport and Kurukshetra Airport at the cost of INR30 lakh (3 million).

On 26 December 2018, Haryana Health Minister Anil Vij announced that a third domestic airport will be established under UDAN III scheme 40 km from the Ambala city at Barnala village next to the Ambala Air Force Station for which a team of Airports Authority of India has already carried out the land survey. The new greenfield airport at Ambala is included in the 13 airports included in the UDAN III scheme. Since most of the technical formalities are complete, an early execution of the project is expected. Hisar and Karnal airports are already included in the list of airports for which airlines can make proposals for the UDAN scheme.

As of January 2019, all five existing government airports in Haryana will be developed to have runway of at least 5000 feet for midsize aircraft and business jets, night landing and parking hangars, as airlines have approached the Haryana government to park their spillover "Non-scheduled Air Operations" (NSOP) aircraft from the congested IGI airport at Delhi to Bhiwani and Narnaul airport. Some of this development work at Hisar, Bhiwani and Narnaul airports is already underway. Hisar will be extended to 10,000 ft by March 2022 for large air crafts.

Railway

Railway in Haryana falls in 2 railway zones (Northern Railway zone and North Western Railway zone), and 3 divisions under those.

Roads and highways

GT Road with Kos Minar and Caravanserais

Military
The modern military history commenced with British colonial rule where George Thomas established modern European style army in 1798 to 1801, and later Colonel James Skinner (1778 – 4 December 1841) the Anglo-Indian military adventurer in India, who founded 1st Skinner's Horse and 3rd Skinner's Horse at Asigarh Fort at Hansi in 1803, which are still part of the Indian Army.

As of January 2020, 139 (>10%) out of 1,322 Vir Chakra in India have been awarded to soldiers from Haryana, which has less than 2% population of India.

Current military installations in Haryana are:
 Indian Army
 Ambala Cantonment
 Chandimandir Cantonment
 Hisar Military Station
 Indian Air Force
 Ambala Air Force Station
 Gurugram Air Force Station is an ammunition dump
 Raja Nahar Singh Faridabad Air Force Logistics Station
 Sirsa Air Force Station
 Indian Navy
 Information Management and Analysis Centre (IMAC) at Gurugram
 Border Security Force
 Hisar BSF Camp
 Central Reserve Police Force (CRPF)
 Hisar CRPF Camp
 Central Industrial Security Force (CISF)
 Mandawar CISF, Sohna
 National Security Guard (NSG) at Manesar

Defunct British-era military installations in Haryana:
 Asigarh Fort at Hansi 
 Karnal Cantonment
 Bharawas, 7 km southwest of Rewari (not to be confused with nearby Bariawas 7 km to the southeast of Rewari)
 Jharsa cantonment and palace of Begum Samru (b.1753 – d.1836), which later became a British cantonment at the same place when Bharwas cantonment was reclocated to Jharsa in Gurugram.

Other cantonments
 Buria cantonment of Sikh ruler during British colonial rule
 Bahadurgarh state cantonment of nawab during British colonial rule
 Balramgarh state cantonment ofRaja Nahar Singh during British colonial rule
 Dujana cantonment of nawab during British colonial rule
 Jhajjar cantonment of nawab during British colonial rule
 Jind State cantonment of nawab Sikh ruler at Jind during British colonial rule
 Kalsia cantonment ofSikh ruler during British colonial rule
 Kapurthala State (Narwana cantonment) of Phulkian Sikh Raja
 Loharu State cantonment of nawab at Loharu during British colonial rule

Polity

Vedic era

Mahajanapadas

Following Mahajanapadas are mentioned in Mahabharata had their land in Haryana: 

 Kuru Kingdom, most of area of Haryana fell under this kingdom, their main capital in Haryana was at Swarnprastha (Sonipat), other 3 capital or main cities were Indraprastha (Delhi), Waghparastha (Baghpat in Uttar Prades) and Tilprastha (Tilpat in Uttar Prades)
 Matsya Kingdom, present day South Haryana
 Surasena, present day Hodal as part of Braj region.

Ancient Khandavprastha forest mentioned in Mahabharata, lay to the west of Yamuna river in modern-day Delhi territory. Pandavas cleared this forest to construct their capital city called Indraprastha. This forest was earlier inhabited by Naga tribes led by a king named Takshaka. Arjuna and Krishna cleared this forest by setting up a fire. The inhabitants of this forest were displaced. This was the root cause of the enmity of the Naga Takshaka towards the Kuru kings who ruled from Indraprastha and Hastinapura.

Janapads

The list of Janapadas falling within Haryana:

Princely states of late medieval and British colonial era

 States at the time of independence 
 With headquarter based in Haryana
 Buria State of Sikhs
 Dujana State of Nawab
 Jind State of Phulkian Misl Sandhu Sikhs
 Kunjpura State of Nawab
 Loharu State 
 Pataudi State
 With headquarter based outside of Haryana with parts of territory within Haryana
 Kapurthala State of Phulkian Misl Sandhu Sikhs included Narwana
 Nabha State of Phulkian Misl Sandhu Sikhs
 Malerkotla State of Nawab 
 Patiala State of Phulkian Misl Sandhu Sikhs included Charkhi Dadri
 Abolished states, due to Indian Rebellion of 1857 or for other reasons.
Rewari State Abolished in 1857. The Last Ruler Rao Tula Ram was the key instigator of revolt.
 Ballabhgarh State of Tewatias. Abolished after 1857 revolution and Raja Nahar Singh hanged to death by British.
 Charkhi Dadri State
 Jhajjar State of Nawab
 Farrukhnagar State of Nawab
 Abolished states, at other times
 Hansi State of James Skinner and George Thomas 
 Jharsa of Begum Samru 
 Kaithal State of Sikhs of Phulkia Sidhu clan
 Rania State of Sikhs, Ranghars of Johiya and Bhatti clans

Religion

Buddhism
Main sites are 
 Mounds: Agroha Mound, Sugh Ancient Mound, 
 Pillars of Ashoka: Hisar, Fatehabad, Topra Kalan Edicts Museum
 Stupas, pagodas and places in the order of travel by Lord Buddha: 
 From Mathura in Uttar Pradesh, Buddha travelled along Grand Trunk Road in Haryana (also see Buddhist pilgrimage sites in Haryana).
 Kamashpura Aastha Pugdal Pagoda (Kumashpur) in Sonipat city, the place where Buddha gave Mahasatipatthana sutta. 
 Kurukshetra Stupa on the banks of sacred Brahma Sarovar in Kurukshetra city was also visited by Hieun Tsang,
 Topra between Kurukshetra and Yamunanagar, now has a large open air museum park housing several replica of Ashoka's edicts including largest Ashoka Chakra in the world, original site of Ashokan pillar which was moved to Feroz Shah Kotla in Delhi in 1356 CE by Firuz Shah Tughlaq.
 Srughna, now known as the Sugh Ancient Mound, on outskirts of Yamunanagar city
 Chaneti Buddhist Stupa, on outskirts of Yamunanagar city, according to Hieun Tsang it was built by the King Ashoka.
 Other Stupas: Adi Badri Sharirika stupa, Assandh Kushan stupa

Hinduism
 Adi Badri
 Agroha Dham
 Baba Thakur
 Bhima Devi Temple Complex at Pinjore
 Bhuteshwar Temple
 Chhapadeshwar Mahadev Mandir
 Dhosi Hill
 Eklavya temple
 Gurugram Bhim Kund
 Jayanti Devi Temple
 Jhirkeshwar mahadev
 Kali Mata Temple
 Kalesar Mahadev
 Kapal Mochan
 Kurukshetra: 48 kos parikrama of Kurukshetra Harsh ka Tilla at Kurukshetra, Brahma Sarovar and Sannihit Sarovar, Jyotisar, Kartikeya Temple, Pehowa 
 Kalayat Ancient Bricks Temple Complex
 Mata Mansa Devi
 Narnaul
 Pindara Temple
 Sheetla Mata Mandir Gurgaon
 Sharda Mata
 Sita Mai Temple
 Sthaneshwar Mahadev Temple 
 Surajkund
 Tosham
 Nar Narayan Cave in Yamuna Nagar
 State Protected Monuments
 Monuments of National Importance

Jainism
 Dehra Temple
 Ranila Jain temple
 Agroha
 Hansi

Sikhism
 Kapal Mochan
 Lohgarh
 Pehowa

See also
 Divisions of Haryana
 History of Punjab
 History of India
 Timeline of Indian history

References

Further reading
 Gazetteers of the Hisar District, 1883–1884
 Punjab District Gazetteers: Gurgaon District statistical tables, 1935. Vol. III
 Imperial Gazetteer of India. Vol. XXVI:

External links
 History of Haryana
Ancient History of Haryana
Harappa Civilization of Haryana